"Living in Oblivion" is a song by American synthpop band Anything Box. It was initially self-released by the band as a 12" single in 1988, with "Time to Go" and "Living in Oblivion (Slow Mix)" on its B-side. It was released again in 1990 as their first major label single, on Epic Records. The song is from their debut album Peace. It was the band's first chart hit, and only single to appear on the Billboard Hot 100, where it reached No. 65. On the Billboard Dance Club Songs chart, the song peaked at No. 10.

A new version titled "Living in Oblivion (MCMXCVI A.D.)" was released in 1996 on their label Orangewerks which contained additional remixes by Digital 3, Paul Robb, Rythmus and Seven Red Seven.

References

1988 songs
1988 singles
1990 singles
American new wave songs
American synth-pop songs
Epic Records singles